Nikolas Kyriakides (born 20 September 2004) is a Cypriot footballer who plays as a defender for Omonia.

Career 
Aged 18, Kyriakides signed his first contract as a professional footballer with Omonia, on 27 May 2022.

Career Statistics

References

External Links 

 
 Club Website

Living people
2004 births